Craig 'Jock' Treleven (born 14 June 1970) is a former Australian rules footballer who played with Hawthorn in the Australian Football League (AFL).

A ruck-rover, Treleven was recruited to Hawthorn after an impressive season for East Fremantle in 1995. That season he had won both a Sandover Medal and Simpson Medal, the latter as West Australia's best player in their interstate match against Queensland. Hawthorn acquired his services with pick 16 in the 1996 pre-season draft and he spent five seasons with the club before leaving and returning home to finish his career in the WAFL.

External links

Craig Treleven at WAFL website

1970 births
Living people
Hawthorn Football Club players
East Fremantle Football Club players
Sandover Medal winners
Australian rules footballers from Western Australia
Western Australian State of Origin players